The eighth series of the Australian cooking game show MasterChef Australia premiered on 1 May 2016 on Network Ten. All the judges from the previous series returned.

This series was won by Elena Duggan in the grand finale against Matt Sinclair, on 26 July 2016.

Contestants

Top 24
The first 19 contestants were announced on 1 May 2016. Cecilia Vuong was chosen having previously been selected in series six, as she withdrew that year before the competition started because of complications from a brain injury. A further 11 applicants were required to cook again the next day for the next four positions. The remaining seven cooks then competed for the final place. The competition includes two siblings for the first time in MasterChef Australia; Jimmy Wong and Theresa Visintin.

Future appearance

 In Series 9 Elena Duggan appeared as a guest judge for a Mystery Box and an Invention Test Challenge, while Matt Sinclair appeared as guest chef for a team challenge.
 In Series 10 Sinclair appeared as a guest chef for an Immunity challenge and won against contestant Khanh Ong.
 In Series 11 Sinclair was one of the mentors for the Immunity Challenges.
 Harry Foster appeared in Series 12 and was eliminated on April 28, 2020, finishing 21st.

Guest chefs

Elimination chart

Episodes and ratings
 Colour key:
  – Highest rating during the series
  – Lowest rating during the series

References

MasterChef Australia
2016 Australian television seasons
Television shows filmed in California